Mingus at Antibes was originally issued by BYG Records under the title Charles Mingus Live With Eric Dolphy in Japan in 1974. It was recorded at a live 1960 performance at the Jazz à Juan festival at Juan-les-Pins by jazz bassist and composer Charles Mingus; and was re-released by Atlantic Records in more complete form as a double album with the title Mingus In Antibes in the United States in 1979.

The album captures a performance at Jazz à Juan, and features some of Mingus's then regular musicians in a generally piano-less quintet, though the band is joined by Bud Powell on "I'll Remember April", and Mingus himself plays some piano on "Wednesday Night Prayer Meeting" and "Better Git Hit in Your Soul".

Track listing 
All compositions by Charles Mingus except where noted.
 "Wednesday Night Prayer Meeting" – 11:54 (included on both BYG and Atlantic issues)
 "Prayer For Passive Resistance" – 8:06 (included on Atlantic issues only)
 "What Love?" – 13:34 (included on Atlantic issues only)
 "I'll Remember April" (Gene de Paul) – 13:39 (included on Atlantic issues only)
 "Folk Forms I" – 11:08 (included on both BYG and Atlantic issues)
 "Better Git Hit In Your Soul" – 11:00 (included on both BYG and Atlantic issues)

Personnel 
 Charles Mingus – bass, piano (on tracks 1 and 6)
 Ted Curson – trumpet
 Eric Dolphy – alto saxophone, bass clarinet (on track 3)
 Booker Ervin – tenor saxophone (except on track 3)
 Dannie Richmond – drums
 Bud Powell – piano (on track 4)

References 

Charles Mingus live albums
1960 live albums
Albums recorded at Jazz à Juan
Atlantic Records live albums
Live instrumental albums